Mediatrix is a title given to Mary, mother of Jesus in Christianity. It refers to the intercessory role of the Blessed Virgin Mary as a mediator in the salvific redemption by her son Jesus Christ and that he bestows graces through her. Mediatrix is an ancient title that has been used by many saints since at least the 5th century. Its use grew during the Middle Ages and reached its height in the writings of saints Louis de Montfort and Alphonsus Liguori in the 18th century.

A general role of intercession is attributed to Mary in Catholicism, Eastern Orthodoxy, and Oriental Orthodoxy, and the term "Mediatrix" was applied to her in the dogmatic constitution Lumen gentium of the Second Vatican Council. "This, however, is to be so understood that it neither takes away from nor adds anything to the dignity and efficaciousness of Christ the one Mediator."

The use of the title Mediatrix and the doctrine of Mary having a higher level of saintly intercession (owing to her special relationship with her son Jesus) is distinct from the theological issues involved in the establishment of Mediatrix of all graces as a dogma. On 12 September 2015, the Congregation for Divine Worship and the Discipline of the Sacraments through the Archdiocese of Lipa, Philippines formerly declared the 1948 Marian apparition under the title Our Lady Mediatrix of All Graces to be authentic and worthy of pious belief, but it is now rejected as non-supernatural by the Congregation of the Doctrine of the Faith on 1 June 2016.

History

Early history
Mediatrix is an ancient title. A prayer attributed to Ephrem the Syrian in the 4th century calls her "after the mediator, you (Mary) are the mediatrix of the whole world." The title was also used in the 5th century by Basil of Seleucia. By the 8th century, the title Mediatrix found common use and Andrew of Crete and saint John of Damascus used it.

These early notions place Mary's mediation on a higher level than that of other forms of the intercession of saints. Her position as the mother of Jesus Christ the redeemer and source of grace makes her preeminent among others who might be called mediators.

Later Middle Ages
The use of the Mediatrix title continued to grow in the Middle Ages, and Bernard of Clairvaux (12th century), Bonaventure, and Bernardino of Siena (15th century) frequently used it.

In the 13th century, Saint Thomas Aquinas noted that only Jesus Christ can be the perfect mediator between God and humankind. However, this does not hinder that others may be called mediators, in some respect, between God and man, because they assist and prepare union between God and man.

The same notion was stated in the 16th century by the Council of Trent, which declared "that the saints, who reign together with Christ, offer up their own prayers to God for men; that it is good and useful suppliantly to invoke them, and to have recourse to their prayers, aid, (and) help for obtaining benefits from God, through His Son, Jesus Christ our Lord, who is our alone Redeemer and Saviour; but that they think impiously, who deny that the saints, who enjoy eternal happiness in heaven, are to be invocated; or who assert either that they do not pray for men; or, that the invocation of them to pray for each of us even in particular, is idolatry; or, that it is repugnant to the word of God; and is opposed to the honour of the one mediator of God and men, Christ Jesus; or, that it is foolish to supplicate, vocally, or mentally, those who reign in heaven".

17th–18th centuries
Reliance on the intercession of Mary grew and reached its height in the writings of saints Louis de Montfort and Alphonsus Liguori in the 18th century.

Louis de Montfort's approach (which later influenced Pope John Paul II) emphasized that Mary is the natural path to approaching Jesus because of her special relationship with him. This reliance on the intercession of Mary is based on the general Montfortean formula: "…to do all our actions by Mary, with Mary, in Mary and for Mary so that we may do them all the more perfectly by Jesus, with Jesus, in Jesus and for Jesus…"

In his book Treatise on Prayer, Alphonsus Liguori reviewed the writings of Thomas Aquinas and Bernard of Clairvaux on the intercession of saints and Mary's role as Mediatrix and strongly supported the title.

19th–21st centuries
Several popes have used the title Mediatrix. Leo XIII used it in 1896 and Pius X in 1904. This continued in the 20th century with Benedict XV and Pius XI. However, Pius XII avoided the use of the title, although he urged reliance on the intercession of Mary.

Pope John Paul II used the title Mediatrix a number of times and in his encyclical Redemptoris Mater wrote:

In September 2012, during the Feast of the Nativity of Mary, claimant visionnaire Emma de Guzman stated that the Virgin Mary revealed her maternal role as "Mediatrix before the Mediator," a special Marian title associated by many Filipino Catholics in reference to Our Lady Mediatrix of All Graces.

Theological issues
Among Catholic theologians, it is undisputed that Jesus Christ is the only mediator between God and the human race, especially in the salvific role of redemption as exhibited by the crucifixion on Mount Calvary. Accordingly, the word "mediator" in the strict sense fits Jesus alone in relation to God, but in a subordinate sense, Christians exercise a mediation "that is effective through, with, and in Christ. The subordinate mediator never stands alone, but is always dependent on Jesus."

With special reference to Mary, the Catechism of the Catholic Church, quoting the Second Vatican Council, which in its document Lumen gentium referred to Mary as "'Advocate, Auxiliatrix, Adjutrix and Mediatrix," says:

At a Mariological Congress held at Czestochowa in August 1996, a commission was established in response to a request, by the Holy See, which had asked to know the opinion of the scholars present at the Congress on the possibility of defining a new dogma of faith regarding Mary as Coredemptrix, Mediatrix and Advocate. (In recent years, the Pope and various dicasteries of the Holy See had received petitions requesting such a definition.) The response of the commission, deliberately brief, was unanimous and precise: It found that the titles, as proposed, were ambiguous, as they can be understood in very different ways. 
It also held that it was not opportune to abandon the path marked out by the Second Vatican Council and proceed to the definition of a new dogma.

Mediatrix of all graces

Going further than expressing belief in Mary as Mediatrix, proposals have been made to declare that Mary is the Mediatrix of all graces. Pope Benedict XV allowed the dioceses of Belgium to celebrate the feast of Mary Mediatrix of all graces on May 31 each year. In printings of the Roman Missal from that date until 1961, the Mass of Mary Mediatrix of All Graces was found in the appendix Missae pro aliquibus locis (Masses for Some Places), but not in the general calendar for use wherever the Roman Rite is celebrated. Other Masses authorized for celebration in different places on the same day were those of the Blessed Virgin Mary Queen of All Saints and Mother of Fair Love and Our Lady of the Sacred Heart of Jesus. The Belgian celebration has now been replaced by an optional memorial on 31 August of the Virgin Mary Mediatrix.

See also
 Co-Redemptrix

References

Pope Pius IX Mariology
Pope Pius XI
Pope Pius XII Mariology
Catholic theology and doctrine
Catholic Mariology
Pope Leo XIII
Titles of Mary
Christian terminology